Limnocalanus is a genus of Centropagidae.

The genus was described in 1863 by Georg Ossian Sars.

The genus has cosmopolitan distribution.

Species:
 Limnocalanus johanseni Marsh, 1920
 Limnocalanus michaelseni (Mrázek, 1901)
 Limnocalanus sarsi Daday, 1901

References

Centropagidae